The voiced labiodental affricate ( in IPA) is a rare affricate consonant that is initiated as a voiced labiodental stop  and released as a voiced labiodental fricative .

Features 
Features of the voiced labiodental affricate:

There are two variants of the stop component:
bilabial, which means it is articulated with both lips. The affricate with this stop component is called bilabial-labiodental.
labiodental, which means it is articulated with the lower lip and the upper teeth.
The fricative component of this affricate is labiodental, articulated with the lower lip and the upper teeth.

Occurrence

Notes

References

External links
 

Affricates
Pulmonic consonants
Voiced oral consonants
Central consonants